Banner is a live album by Desperation Band, released by Integrity Music on September 30, 2014. The album was produced by Jon Egan and Michael Rossback.

Critical reception

Awarding the album four stars at CCM Magazine, Grace Aspinwall writes, "With its refreshing, clean and clear sound, Banner succeeds in all aspects: vocals, musicality and arrangements." Barry Westman, giving the album four and a half star from Worship Leader, states, "Banner, an album of epic proportions". Indicating in a three and a half star review for New Release Today, Sarah Fine says, "What Banner lacks in musical originality, it more than makes up for in spiritual substance." Matt McChlery, rating the album an eight out of ten at Cross Rhythms, describes, "This is a great album that contains numerous singable songs". Signaling in a four star review from 365 Days of Inspiring Media, Joshua Andre responds, "With worship ballads and pop radio tunes alike, Banner is a smorgasbord of a worship leader's dream of diversity".

Awards and accolades
This album was No. 18 on the Worship Leader's Top 20 Albums of 2014 list.

Track listing

Chart performance

References

2014 live albums
Desperation Band albums